Banarsidas Chaturvedi (24 December 1892 – 2 May 1985) was a noted Hindi-language writer, journalist and recipient of Padma Bhushan awarded by Government of India in 1973. He was born on 24 December 1892 in Firozabad in the North-Western Provinces of British India and died on 2 May 1985.
He served as a nominated member of Rajya Sabha for twelve years.

Banarsidas became interested in the plight of indentured labourers (Girmitiya) of Indian origin in Fiji where he spent several years. He wrote extensively about the predicament of Indians in Fiji. With the intervention of Reverend C. F. Andrews, the system of indentured labour in Fiji was formally ended in 1920.

He was actively associated with the founding and construction of Hindi Bhavana of Rabindranath Tagore's Visva Bharati at Santiniketan in 1939.

A book in English titled 'Charles Freer Andrews, a Narrative' written by Banarsidas with Marjorie Sykes as co-author and foreword written by Mahatma Gandhi was published in 1949.

References

Further reading

1892 births
Hindi-language writers
1985 deaths
People from Firozabad
Nominated members of the Rajya Sabha
Recipients of the Padma Bhushan in literature & education
Journalists from Uttar Pradesh
20th-century Indian journalists
20th-century Indian politicians